Raghbir Singh Pathania (sometimes erroneously spelled Raghubir),  was an Indian Lieutenant Colonel who was the primary commander of the 2nd Jammu and Kashmir Rifles during the Battle of Jassin, in which he was killed while defending a garrison of 4 Indian Brigades.

Biography

Family
Raghbir was born on 1874 as the son of Nihal Singh Pathania and the brother of Gandharb Singh. On May 25, 1913, he was the father of Anant Singh Pathania.

Military career
He enlisted into military service at the rank of Lieutenant Colonel of the 2nd Jammu and Kashmir Rifles which consisted of Muslims and Gurkhas. During his military career, he earned the title of Sardar Bahadur, being promoted to Commander-in-chief as well as earning the Order of British India.

Battle of Jassin

After the outbreak of World War I, the British Indian Army were initially sent to the East African Campaign and the 2nd Jammu and Kashmir Rifles were a part of the divisions sent to German East Africa. On January 18, 1915, the Germans attacked the village of Jassin to secure Tanga which had successfully repelled an Anglo-Indian Invasion. The garrison of the town was a weak and meager force of around 4 brigades commanded by Singh. He would be killed during the defense of the village which lead to the Germans capturing it.

References

1874 births
1915 deaths
British Indian Army officers
Indian Army personnel killed in World War I
People from Kangra, Himachal Pradesh
Military personnel of British India
Sardar Bahadurs